Mount Albion may refer to:

 Mount Albion (Antarctica), a mountain peak of the Athos Range
 Mount Albion, Ontario, a village in Canada
 Mount Albion, Prince Edward Island, a hamlet in Canada
 Mount Albion Cemetery, a cemetery in the U.S. state of New York

See also
 Mount Albion complex